Surehuayco (possibly from Aymara suri rhea, wayku brook or gorge, "rhea brook (or gorge)") and from Quechua Suri Wayq'u) is a mountain in the Andes of southern Peru, about  high. It is situated in the Moquegua Region, Mariscal Nieto Province, Torata District. It lies southwest of the mountain Iruma and east of Achucallani. Surehuayco is also the name of an intermittent stream north of the mountain.

References

Mountains of Moquegua Region
Mountains of Peru